The 1999 NCAA Division I women's soccer tournament (also known as the 1999 Women's College Cup) was the 18th annual single-elimination tournament to determine the national champion of NCAA Division I women's collegiate soccer. The semifinals and championship game were played at Spartan Stadium in San Jose, California during December 1999. This remains the Women's College Cup tournament with the highest total attendance, with over 72,219 people attending all tournament matches.

North Carolina defeated Notre Dame in the final, 2–0, to win their fifteenth national title. The Tar Heels (24–2) were coached by Anson Dorrance. 

The most outstanding offensive player was Susan Bush from North Carolina, and the most outstanding defensive player was Lorrie Fair, also from North Carolina. Bush and Fair, along with ten other players, were named to the All-Tournament team.

The tournament's leading scorer, with 4 goals, was Kim Patrick from North Carolina.

Qualification

All Division I women's soccer programs were eligible to qualify for the tournament. The tournament field remained fixed at 48 teams.

Play-in game

Format
Just as before, the final two rounds, deemed the Women's College Cup were played at a pre-determined neutral site. All other rounds were played on campus sites at the home field of the higher-seeded team. The top sixteen teams were given a bye to the Second Round while the remaining thirty-two teams played in the preliminary First Round.

Teams

Bracket

All-tournament team
LaKeysia Beene, Notre Dame
Susan Bush, North Carolina (most outstanding offensive player)
Lorrie Fair, North Carolina (most outstanding defensive player)
Meredith Florance, North Carolina
Jen Grubb, Notre Dame
Jena Kluegel, North Carolina
Kim Patrick, North Carolina
Anne Remy, North Carolina
Nikki Serlenga, Santa Clara
Danielle Slaton, Santa Clara
Jenny Streiffer, Notre Dame
Christie Welsh, Penn State

See also 
 NCAA Division II Women's Soccer Championship
 NCAA Division III Women's Soccer Championship

References

NCAA
NCAA Women's Soccer Championship
NCAA Division I Women's Soccer Tournament
NCAA Division I Women's Soccer Tournament
NCAA Division I Women's Soccer Tournament